This article aims at showing the evolution of the Angolan women's national handball squad throughout the 1980s, 1990s and 2000s, in the competitions organized by the African Handball Confederation and the International Handball Federation.

2011–2019

2001–2010

1991–2000

1981–1990

See also
Angola Women's Handball League
Federação Angolana de Andebol
List of Angola international footballers
List of Angola national basketball team players

References

Handball in Angola
List
Angola